Bungarus andamanensis, the South Andaman krait, is a species of krait, a venomous elapid snake, which is found in the Andaman Islands of India.

References

 Biswas S; Sanyal D P 1978 A new species of krait of the genus Bungarus Daudin, 1803 (Serpentes: Elapidae) from the Andaman Island. J. Bombay Nat. Hist. Soc. 75 (1): 179-183
 Das, I. 1999. Biogeography of the amphibians and reptiles of the Andaman and Nicobar Islands, India. In: Ota. H (Editor), Tropical Island Herpetofauna: Origin, Current Diversity, and Conservation. Elsevier Science, Amsterdam, Holland. 43-77
 Harikrishnan, S., Vasudevan, K., & Choudhury, B. C. (2010). A review of herpetofaunal species descriptions and studies from Andaman and Nicobar Islands, with an updated checklist. In Ramakrishna, Raghunathan, C. and Sivaperuman, C. (Eds) 2010. Recent Trends in Biodiversity of Andaman and Nicobar Islands: 1-542 (Published by the Director, Zool. Surv. India, Kolkata)
 Slowinski J B. 1994 A phylogenetic analysis of Bungarus (Elapidae) based on morphological characters. Journal of Herpetology 28 (4): 440–446.

External links
 

andamanensis
Reptiles of India
Endemic fauna of the Andaman Islands
Reptiles described in 1978